Family cookbooks are books which contain a variety of recipes collected by specific families. Whilst these cookbooks are sometimes later published, the concept is of a commonplace book where useful recipes are retained and passed on to later generations.

The recipes can be developed by the family or collated from other sources - and may be so familiar to the family that the origin is forgotten or not acknowledged.

Family cookbooks as memory
Whilst the primary function of a family cookbook is as a scrapbook to collect recipes and cooking techniques, an important function is also to provide context and promote familial memory. 

Scholars use these kinds of collected manuscripts to give insights into family history in the era when they were written, such as about gender roles and women's emancipation.

References

See also
Commonplace book
Family traditions

Cookbooks
Family